The Twelfth Legislative Assembly of Jammu and Kashmir constituted after the 2014 Jammu and Kashmir Legislative Assembly elections which were concluded on 20 December 2014, with the results being declared on 23 December 2014.

Membership by party

 JKPDP (28)
 BJP (25)
 JKNC (15)
 INC (12)
 JKPC (2)
 CPI(M) (1)
 JKPDF (1)
 IND (3)
 NOM (2)

Members of Legislative Assembly 
Source:

References

Jammu and Kashmir Legislative Assembly
2014 establishments in Jammu and Kashmir
2019 disestablishments in India